Naxos is a Greek island.

Naxos may also refer to:

Places

Greece
Naxos (city), a town and former municipality on the island of Naxos
Naxos (regional unit), a Greek government division 
Naxos and Lesser Cyclades, one of two municipalities within the regional unit
Naxos Island National Airport
Duchy of Naxos (Duchy of the Archipelago), a maritime state created by the Venetians between 1207-1579
Naxos (Crete), an ancient Greek city in Crete

Italy
Naxos (Sicily), an ancient Greek city in Sicily
Giardini Naxos, a modern city on the site of the above

Battles
Siege of Naxos (499 BC), an engagement in the Cyclades during the Greco-Persian Wars
Siege of Naxos (490 BC), an engagement in the Cyclades during the Greco-Persian Wars
Battle of Naxos (376 BC), an engagement in the Cyclades during the Boeotian War

Music
Naxos (company), a music and audio publishing company
Naxos Quartets, a series of string quartets by Peter Maxwell Davies
Ariadne auf Naxos, an opera by Richard Strauss

Other
Naxos (mythology), eponym of the island Naxos
Naxos disease, Arrhythmogenic right ventricular dysplasia
Naxos radar detector, a German World War II countermeasure